Asaphodes helias is a species of moth in the family Geometridae. It is endemic to New Zealand. It has been found in the middle and southern parts of the South Island. This species frequents tussock and scrubby habitat. The host plants of the larvae of this species include Cardamine and Ranunculus species. They have also been witnessed feeing on exotic buttercup species in the genus Bellis. Adults are on the wing in January and February.

Taxonomy
This species was described by Edward Meyrick in 1883 as Larentia helias using material he collected in Dunedin. Meyrick gave a fuller description of the species later in 1884. George Hudson discussed and illustrated this species as Xanthorhoe helias in 1898. Hudson also discussed and illustrated the species under this name in his 1928 publication The Butterflies and Moths of New Zealand. In 1971 John S. Dugdale placed this species within the genus Asaphodes. In 1988 John S. Dugdale confirmed this placement. The type specimen is held at the Natural History Museum, London.

Description

Hudson described the species as follows:

Distribution

This species is endemic to New Zealand. As well as the type locality of Dunedin, the species has been found in the Dansey Ecological district and the Nevis Red Tussock Fen in Otago. This species has also been found near the Hooker traffic bridge close to Mount Franklin in Canterbury as well as on The Hump and Mount Cleughearn in Southland.

Biology and life cycle
A. helias is on the wing in January and February.

Habitat and host plant
This moth has been observed as frequenting tussock and scrubby areas that have the fern Polystichum vestitum present. The larvae of A. helias have been reared in captivity on forest herbs including Cardamine and Ranunculus species. Larvae have also been found feeding from species within these genera in the wild. The larvae of A. helias have also adapted to feeding on an exotic buttercup.

References

Larentiinae
Moths described in 1883
Moths of New Zealand
Endemic fauna of New Zealand
Taxa named by Edward Meyrick
Endemic moths of New Zealand